Beta Piscis Austrini, Latinized from β Piscis Austrini, is catalogued as a binary star system in the southern constellation of Piscis Austrinus. It is visible to the naked eye with an apparent visual magnitude of +4.29. Based upon an annual parallax shift of 22.84 mas as seen from the Earth, the star is located 143 light years from the Sun.

Oblak (1978) identified this as a triple star system, although subsequent sources list it as a binary. The magnitude 4.29 primary, component A, is a white-hued A-type main sequence star with a stellar classification of A1 V. It has an estimated 2.3 times the mass of the Sun and 2.1 times the Sun's radius. The star is radiating 37 times the solar luminosity from its photosphere at an effective temperature of 9,638 K. There is evidence for an infrared excess, indicating the presence of an orbiting debris disk. This has an estimated temperature of 188 K, indicating an orbital distance of 12 AU from the host star. The magnitude 7.8 secondary, component B, has a class of A2 V and lies at an angular separation of 30.3 arc seconds.

Beta Piscis Austrini is moving through the Galaxy at a speed of 14.4 km/s relative to the Sun.

With Delta and Zeta it constituted Tien Kang ("heavenly rope") in China.

References

External links

A-type main-sequence stars
Circumstellar disks
Double stars

Piscis Austrinus
Piscis Austrini, Beta
Durchmusterung objects
Piscis Austrini, 17
111188
111188
8576